The National Textile Museum is a museum in Kuala Lumpur, Malaysia. The museum is open daily from 9am to 6pm, admission fees started from RM2 to RM5.

It is adjacent to the Sultan Abdul Samad Building.

History

Designed by Arthur Benison Hubback in an Indo-Saracenic Revival architecture, the building was originally completed in 1905 to house the headquarters for the Federated Malay States Railways (FMSR, now KTM). After the FMSR moved to the Railway Administration Building in 1917, the building was handed to the Selangor Public Works department, and has subsequently housed various government and commercial occupants, including the Selangor Water Department, the Malaysian Central Bank, Agricultural Bank of Malaysia, Malaysian Craft and the High Court, before being converted for use as the National Textile Museum and opened to the public on 9 January 2010.

The building is officially designated as JKR Building 26. It was gazetted as a historical building in 1983.

Architecture
The museum building is a 2.5-floor building, occupying an area of 3,145.3 m2. The building was designed with Moorish architectural style.

Exhibitions
 Pohon Budi Gallery
 Pelangi Gallery
 Teluk Berantai Gallery
 Ratna Sari Gallery

Transportation
The museum is accessible within walking distance south west of  Masjid Jamek LRT Station of RapidKL.

See also
 List of museums in Malaysia
 List of tourist attractions in Malaysia

References

External links

 

2010 establishments in Malaysia
Museums established in 2010
Museums in Kuala Lumpur
Textile museums